Samtse is a town and the headquarters of the Samtse District in Bhutan. The population of the town was 5,396 as of 2017. The population of the Samtse district was 60,100 at the 2005 census.

Samtse is close to the Bhutan–India border. Across the border is the Indian town of Chamurchi.

Climate
Samtse features a dry-winter humid subtropical climate (Köppen Cwa) with very heavy rainfall in summer.

References

Populated places in Bhutan
Bhutan–India border crossings